Alvin Fred "Doggie" Julian (April 5, 1901 – July 28, 1967) was an American football, basketball, and baseball player and coach.  He served as the head basketball coach at Muhlenberg College from 1936 to 1945, at the College of the Holy Cross from 1945 to 1948, and at Dartmouth College from 1950 to 1967, compiling a career college basketball record of 379–332. Julian led Holy Cross to the NCAA title in 1947.  His team, which included later National Basketball Association (NBA) great Bob Cousy, almost repeated this feat in 1948, losing in the semifinals. Julian was engaged by the Boston Celtics of the NBA after his college success, but he recorded only a 47–81 mark before he was dismissed in 1950. Julian was also the head football coach at Schuylkill College from 1925 to 1928, Albright College from 1929 to 1930, and Mulhlenberg from 1936 to 1944, amassing a career college football record of 77–63–3.  In addition, he served as Mulhlenberg's head baseball coach from 1942 to 1944, tallying a mark of 16–18.  Julian was inducted into the Naismith Memorial Basketball Hall of Fame as a coach in 1968.

Early life and playing career
Julian was born in Reading, Pennsylvania.  He attended Bucknell University, where he lettered in football, basketball, and baseball, and from which he graduated in 1923.  From 1923 to 1926, Julian played minor league baseball with a number of clubs: the Reading Keystones, the Harrisburg Senators, the York White Roses, the Chambersburg Maroons, and the Lawrence Merry Macks.

Death
Julian died on July 28, 1967 at a nursing home in White River Junction, Vermont.  He had suffered a stroke the previous December in Rochester, New York while coaching Dartmouth in the Kodak Classic basketball tournament.

Head coaching record

College basketball

College football

High school football

See also
 List of NCAA Division I Men's Final Four appearances by coach

References

External links
 

 Basketball-Reference.com profile 
 

1901 births
1967 deaths
Albright Lions football coaches
American football ends
American men's basketball coaches
American men's basketball players
Baseball catchers
Baseball coaches from Pennsylvania
Baseball players from Pennsylvania
Basketball coaches from Pennsylvania
Boston Celtics head coaches
Bucknell Bison baseball players
Bucknell Bison football players
Bucknell Bison men's basketball players
Chambersburg Maroons players
College men's basketball head coaches in the United States
Dartmouth Big Green men's basketball coaches
Harrisburg Senators players
High school football coaches in Pennsylvania
Holy Cross Crusaders men's basketball coaches
Lawrence Merry Macks players
Muhlenberg Mules baseball coaches
Muhlenberg Mules football coaches
Muhlenberg Mules men's basketball coaches
Naismith Memorial Basketball Hall of Fame inductees
Players of American football from Pennsylvania
Pottsville Maroons (Anthracite League) players
Reading Keystones players
Sportspeople from Reading, Pennsylvania
York White Roses players